The Saint Abroad is a collection of two mystery novellas by Fleming Lee that continues the adventures of the sleuth Simon Templar (a.k.a. "The Saint") created by Leslie Charteris. This book was first published in the United States in 1969 by The Crime Club and in the United Kingdom in 1970 by Hodder and Stoughton.

Although credited to Leslie Charteris on the front cover, Fleming Lee was credited with writing the novellas. Two episodes from the 1962-69 television series The Saint, originally written by Michael Pertwee, were based on the novellas. Charteris served in an editorial capacity for the episodes.

Stories
The book consisted of the following stories:

"The Art Collectors"
"The Persistent Patriots"

1969 novels
Simon Templar books
American novellas
The Crime Club books